North Macedonia competed in the Junior Eurovision Song Contest 2022 in Armenia, which was held on 11 December 2022 in Yerevan. Macedonian broadcaster Macedonian Radio Television (MRT) is responsible for the country's participation in the contest, and selected Lara, Jovan and Irina as the Macedonian entrants.

Background 

North Macedonia continued to participate in the contest, but the country withdrew in 2020 due to the COVID-19 pandemic. In the 2021 contest, Dajte Muzika represented the country with the song "Green Forces" and placed 9th with a total of 114 points, being the country's first second Top 10 placement in a row since 2008.

Before Junior Eurovision 
An audition round was held on 23 June 2022 at the MRT Studios in Skopje. The selection criteria were vocal, artistic and scenic quality. On 29 June 2022, it was revealed that Lara Trpčeska and Irina Dazidovska had been selected as Macedonian entrants by the committee. Although originally not part of the act, Jovan Jakimovski was later added after Lara and Irina were selected, and on 2 November it was revealed Lara feat. Jovan and Irina will represent the country with the song "Životot e pred mene", written by Lara Trpčeska, Simon Trpčeski, Jovan Jakimovski and Darko Dimitrov. The song premiered on 3 November 2022 during the MRT programme Dnevnik 2.

At Junior Eurovision 
After the opening ceremony, which took place on 5 December 2022, it was announced that North Macedonia would perform tenth on 11 December 2022, following Ireland and preceding Spain.

Voting

Detailed voting results

Notes and references

Notes

References 

North Macedonia
2022
Junior Eurovision Song Contest